Hemashree Hosahalli Nagaraju (1982 – 9 October 2012) was Indian actress who worked in Kannada television soap operas. A struggling actress, she had also appeared in a handful of Kannada films in supporting roles. At the 2008 Karnataka Legislative Assembly elections, she contested with a Bahujan Samaj Party (BSP) ticket for her home town  Chikkanayakana Halli in the Tumkur region of Karnataka. She died of mysterious circumstances in October 2012, and her husband Surendra Babu was alleged to have murdered her.

Career 
Hemashree made her debut as an actress in 2001, as a 19-year-old, in a Kannada television soap opera. She trained at the Adarsha Film and T. V. Institute, Bangalore. In the following years, she worked in soaps such as Danda Pindagalu, Saahasa Lakshmiyaru and others made by S. Narayan. She appeared in minor roles in films, Varsha and Sirivantha (2006).

Personal life 
Hemashree was married to R. Surendra Babu, an advocate and a realtor, on 22 June 2011. She was coerced to marry him by her mother, who ha received a dowry of 50 lakh from Babu, who was 48 at the time. The followed day, she registered a complaint with the Bangalore City Police over the matter and sought police protection fearing that Babu could harm her. It was also revealed that her "allegedly greedy family" forced her into politics. The couple lived in the Banashankari neighbourhood of Bangalore.

Partial filmography

References 

2012 deaths
Indian television actresses
People from Tumkur
Actresses in Kannada cinema
Indian film actresses
Date of birth missing
1982 births
21st-century Indian actresses
Actresses in Kannada television
Actresses from Karnataka